The Laurence Olivier Award for Best Set Designer was an annual award presented by the Society of London Theatre in recognition of achievements in commercial London theatre. The awards were established as the Society of West End Theatre Awards in 1976, and renamed in 1984 in honour of English actor and director Laurence Olivier.

The award was introduced in 1991 and retired after the 2002 ceremony.

Winners and nominees

1990s

2000s

See also
 Drama Desk Award for Outstanding Set Design
 Tony Award for Best Scenic Design

References

External links
 

Set Designer